Dinosaur State Park and Arboretum is a state-owned natural history preserve occupying  in the town of Rocky Hill, Connecticut. The state park protects one of the largest dinosaur track sites in North America. The park was created in recognition of fossil trackways embedded in sandstone from the beginning of the Jurassic period, about 200 million years ago. The facility is managed by the Connecticut Department of Energy and Environmental Protection.

History
The Rocky Hill dinosaur tracks were uncovered in 1966, adding to the extensive legacy of fossil discoveries made in the Connecticut Valley since the 19th century. A bulldozer operator noticed the tracks while excavating the site for a new state office building. The site opened as Dinosaur State Park in 1968, the same year its  dinosaur trackway was memorialized as a Registered National Landmark.

Features
Geodesic dome
The park's  geodesic dome (see picture at right) encloses some 500 tracks while another 1,500 remain buried for preservation. The sandstone layer preserving the tracks is a section of the East Berlin Formation, which corresponds to a sandy lakeshore from the Early Jurassic, over 200 million years ago. The largest and most plentiful footprints bear the name Eubrontes, an ichnogenus (fossilized footprint type) named by geologist Edward Hitchcock. They were probably created by a carnivorous theropod dinosaur similar to Dilophosaurus.

In addition to the tracks, the dome houses life-sized dioramas of plants and creatures, including Dilophosaurus, from depict the Triassic and Jurassic periods. Other exhibits include interactive displays; a reconstruction of a geologic foundation; and a historical exhibit depicting highlights of the unearthing of the tracks in 1966. The discovery room houses a blue-tongued skink, ball python, and dinosaur-related arts and crafts. Rock slabs with other Connecticut Valley fossil tracks, including large four-toed Otozoum tracks with visible skin impressions, can also be seen.

Arboretum
The arboretum's  of trails pass through some 250 species and cultivars of conifers, plus collections of arborvitae, chamaecyparis, ginkgo, juniper, katsura, pine, sequoia, and magnolia. Rarer species in the collection include the evergreen southern magnolia and monkey puzzle. The addition of woody plants from Cretaceous angiosperm families has been part of the arboretum's attempt to grow as many representatives of Mesozoic-era plant families as the site's New England climate will allow.

Events and activities
The park offers educational films, guided trail walks, and lectures. Warm-month activities include footprint track casting and mining for gems and fossils. In August, Dinosaur State Park Day offers games, arts and crafts activities, and live music. There is a stone path that leads to the domed museum with a timeline showing the evolution of earth from its creation to today. From May–October visitors can see an outdoor exhibit teaching how paleontologists ply their trade. There are two and a half miles of hiking trails in the park.

See also
Connecticut River Valley trackways
Dinosaur Footprints Reservation
List of botanical gardens in the United States
List of fossil sites

References

External links

Dinosaur State Park Connecticut Department of Energy and Environmental Protection
Dinosaur State Park Map Connecticut Department of Energy and Environmental Protection
Dinosaur State Park  Friends of Dinosaur Park and Arboretum

Arboreta in Connecticut
Botanical gardens in Connecticut
State parks of Connecticut
Dinosaur trace fossils
Fossil trackways in the United States
Jurassic paleontological sites of North America
Natural history of Connecticut
National Natural Landmarks in Connecticut
Natural history museums in Connecticut
Dinosaur museums in the United States
Museums in Hartford County, Connecticut
Parks in Hartford County, Connecticut
Rocky Hill, Connecticut
Protected areas established in 1968
1968 establishments in Connecticut
Fossil parks in the United States
Paleontology in Connecticut
1966 in paleontology
1968 in paleontology